Peter Boyle (24 March 1951 – c. 18 January 2013), was a football striker and manager, who played for Australia at international level.

Career

Boyle began his career with Scottish junior side Larkhall Thistle, before signing for Clyde in 1972. He netted 32 goals in 119 league appearances for the Shawfield club, before moving to Australia in 1977 to join West Adelaide Hellas Soccer Club in the  Phillips National Soccer League.

In 1980, Boyle received a call up to the Australian national team. He got his only international cap in a friendly with Czechoslovakia in the same year.

Honours 
 Larkhall Thistle
 Dryburgh Cup: 1971–72
 RJ McLeod Cup: 1971–72

 Clyde
 Scottish Division Two: 1972–73

 West Adelaide
National Soccer League: 1978

 Green Gully
 Victorian State League: 1983
 VSL Ampol Cup: 1983
VSL Cup: Runner-up 1983

References

External links
 

1951 births
2013 deaths
Footballers from Glasgow
Scottish footballers
Scottish emigrants to Australia
Australian soccer players
Australia international soccer players
National Soccer League (Australia) players
Scottish Football League players
Clyde F.C. players
West Adelaide SC players
Larkhall Thistle F.C. players
Association football forwards